Tammaritu I, son of Urtak, was briefly (from 653-652 BCE) a ruler in the ancient kingdom of Elam, ruling after the beheading of his predecessor Teumman in 653. He ruled part of Elam while his brother, Ummanigash (son of Urtak), ruled another.

Urtak, the father of Ummanigash and Tammaritu, had ruled Elam from 675 to 664, at which point he died and was succeeded by Teumman. When Teumman rose to power, Urtak's sons Ummanigash, Ummanappa, and Tammaritu escaped to Assyria in fear of Teumman, and lived under Assyrian protection at Nineveh. Based on his position in an Assyrian lists, Tammaritu was likely a younger son of Urtak. The Assyrian Ashurbanipal, at the Battle of Ulai, killed Teumman, opening the way for the rule of Tammaritu and Ummanigash. 

After the death of Teumman, the Assyrian king placed Ummanigash as "king" over the Elamite city of Madaktu, and his brother Tammaritu as "king" of Hidalu. Meanwhile, Ashurbanipal faced an attempt by his brother, Shamash-shum-ukin, king of Babylon, to take over the Assyrian Empire. Ummanigash joined this rebellion, sending soldiers to the aid of Shamash-shum-ukin in 652. The Elamite forces were defeated, and shortly thereafter an individual by the name of Tammaritu (not the brother of Teumman) came to power in Elam, likely as a result of the Elamite defeat. This successor of Ummanigash is known to modern history as Tammaritu II.

See also
List of rulers of Elam

References

Elamite people
7th-century BC deaths
7th-century BC rulers
Military history of the ancient Near East
Elamite kings
Kings of the Neo-Elamite Period
Year of birth unknown
Year of death unknown